Theuns Jordaan (10 January 1971 – 17 November 2021) was a South African singer-songwriter.

Biography
Jordaan was born on 10 January 1971 on a Karoo farm near Venterstad in the Eastern Cape. While studying industrial psychology at the University of Stellenbosch, he had his first performance on 21 October 1992 at a local bar called The Terrace. He started composing his own lyrics, resulting in five songs of his debut album, Vreemde Stad. Theuns attended Volkskool High School in Graaff-Reinet in the Eastern Cape. While at school, Std 9 and matric he played music and sang to local patrons at a pizza restaurant/ pub called  Trail in.

After he completed his studies, Jordaan spent a year as an entrepreneur. In October 1998, he moved from the Cape to Pretoria and, after gaining popularity in the city, recorded his debut album, Vreemde Stad, in Stellenbosch. This album was released in 2000 at the Klein Karoo Nasionale Kunstefees in Oudtshoorn. EMI released Vreemde Stad shortly afterwards, and the album surpassed triple platinum status (150,000 copies) in July 2003.

He launched his second album, Tjailatyd at the Aardklop music festival in 2002, which also sold more than 150,000 records. The South African guitar player, Anton L'Amour, performed with Theuns and was responsible for all the guitar tracks in Vreemde Stad and Tjailatyd.

Personal life
Jordaan died on 17 November 2021, after being diagnosed with leukemia in September 2020. He was laid to rest in Pretoria on 26 November 2021.

Music
Jordaan's singing was characterized by his deeply emotive bass voice. His music has been said to be "faintly bluesly, radio-friendly", with his lyrics "infused with a mournful love of South Africa".

Discography
Vreemde stad (1999)
Tjailatyd (2002)
Seisoen (2005)
Kouevuur (2009)
Roeper (2012)
Tribute to the poets (2014)
Agter Slot en Grendel (2020)

References

External links
 

1971 births
2021 deaths
Afrikaner people
Afrikaans-language singers
People from Walter Sisulu Local Municipality
South African people of French descent
21st-century South African male singers
Stellenbosch University alumni
Deaths from leukemia 
Deaths from cancer in South Africa